Euphorbia ankazobensis is a species of plant in the family Euphorbiaceae. It is endemic to Madagascar. 

It is known from one single collection in the Ankazobe area of Madagascar's Central Highlands. Its natural habitat is in remnant montane forest. It is threatened by habitat loss, and its natural habitat is extremely fragmented and degraded by human activity. It is assessed as critically endangered.

Trade in this species is regulated under Appendix II of CITES.

References

Endemic flora of Madagascar
Flora of the Madagascar subhumid forests
ankazobensis
ankazobensis
Critically endangered plants
Taxonomy articles created by Polbot